Hiba El Jaafil (born 7 January 1987) is a Lebanese football manager and former player who played as a midfielder. She is also a former futsal player, and represented Lebanon internationally in both football and futsal.

Early life
El Jaafil was born in Sidon and raised in the Ouzai district of Beirut.

Club career 
When she turned 15, El Jaafil joined Majd, which changed their name to Sadaka after less than a year. She stayed at the club for four years, before playing for Arz for one year. She then moved to Shabab Arabi, which changed their name to Arabi Tripoli.

International career
El Jaafil has been capped for Lebanon at senior level in both football and futsal. In football, she represented Lebanon at the 2014 AFC Women's Asian Cup qualification in 2013, where she played three games and scored one goal against Kuwait.

In futsal, El Jaafil played for Lebanon at the 2008 WAFF Women's Futsal Championship.

Managerial career
In July 2014 El Jaafil became head coach of the Lebanon women's national under-19 team, then of the under-17 team in September 2014, with whom she won the 2015 Arab U-17 Women's Cup. She stopped coaching both sides in 2016 due to problems with the Lebanese Football Association.

El Jaafil also coached the senior team at the 2015 Aphrodite Cup.

Career statistics

International
Scores and results list Lebanon's goal tally first, score column indicates score after each El Jaafil goal.

Honours

Player 
Lebanon
 WAFF Women's Championship third place: 2007

Manager 
Lebanon U17
 Arab U-17 Women's Cup: 2015

See also
 List of Lebanon women's international footballers

References

External links
 
 

1987 births
Living people
People from Sidon
Lebanese women's footballers
Lebanese women's futsal players
Women's association football midfielders
Lebanon women's youth international footballers
Lebanon women's international footballers
Lebanese Women's Football League players
Sadaka SC women's footballers
Lebanese football managers
Female association football managers
Women's association football managers
Lebanon women's national football team managers